Tianjin Middle School No. 7 was founded in 1951, and was one of the earliest key high schools in Tianjin. It is a state model high school which employs eight special-grade teachers and three Hedong District teachers.

References

High schools in Tianjin
Middle schools